Matthew Carruthers (born 22 July 1976) is an English former professional footballer who played in the Football League for Mansfield Town.

References

External links
Matt Carruthers Player Profile, Nuts and Bolts Archive 

1976 births
Living people
English footballers
Association football forwards
English Football League players
Mansfield Town F.C. players
Dover Athletic F.C. players
Newport (IOW) F.C. players
Ashford United F.C. players
Welling United F.C. players
Folkestone Invicta F.C. players